Jeongseon Lee clan is one of the Korean clans. Their Bon-gwan is in Jeongseon County, Gangwon Province (historical). According to the research held in 2000, the number of Jeongseon Lee clan’s member was 3657. Their founder was  who immigrated to Goryeo and was settled in Qìng Prefecture to avoid war with Jin dynasty (1115–1234) happened in Song dynasty period during Emperor Huizong of Song’s reign.  was originally born as a third son in Lý dynasty, Vietnam when Lý Nhân Tông, 4th emperor, ruled. However, he exiled himself to Song dynasty because he was involved a political war.

See also 
 Korean clan names of foreign origin
 Hwasan Lee clan

References

External links 
 

 
Korean clan names of Vietnamese origin
Yi clans
South Korea–Vietnam relations